Letoa is a monotypic snout moth genus described by Francis Walker in 1866. Its only species, Letoa patulella, described by the same author in the same year, is found in India.

References

Phycitinae
Monotypic moth genera
Moths of Asia